Attucks High School is a former school in Hopkinsville, Kentucky, built in 1916. It was Hopkinsville's first public school for black students and was converted to an integrated middle school in 1967, the Attucks Middle School or simply Attucks School, before being shut down in 1988. It was listed on the National Register of Historic Places in 2013. It is at 712 1st Street.

The school was built partially from brick reclaimed from a former school, the Clay Street School. It was designed by architect John T. Waller and was built by the Forbes Manufacturing Company in a somewhat Italian Renaissance style, at a cost of $17,640. The listing includes two contributing buildings.

References

External links
Crispus Attucks School (4K), video

Public middle schools in Kentucky
Public high schools in Kentucky
National Register of Historic Places in Christian County, Kentucky
Renaissance Revival architecture in Kentucky
School buildings completed in 1916
1916 establishments in Kentucky
School buildings on the National Register of Historic Places in Kentucky
Schools in Christian County, Kentucky
Italian Renaissance Revival architecture in the United States
Historically segregated African-American schools in Kentucky
Unused buildings in Kentucky